The Curița is a left tributary of the river Cașin in Romania. It discharges into the Cașin in the village Cașin.

References

Rivers of Romania
Rivers of Bacău County